Conklin Town Hall, also known as Alpheus Corby Residence and The Castle, is a historic town hall located at Conklin in Broome County, New York. It was built in 1908 as a private residence and is a concrete block building, faced with concrete blocks painted to look like stone.  The main feature is a three-story square tower.  It became the Conklin town hall in 1944.

It was listed on the National Register of Historic Places in 2006.

References

Buildings and structures in Broome County, New York
History of Broome County, New York
National Register of Historic Places in Broome County, New York
Government buildings completed in 1908
City and town halls on the National Register of Historic Places in New York (state)
1908 establishments in New York (state)